The 2004 Macau Grand Prix (formally the 51st Macau Grand Prix) was a motor race for Formula Three cars that was held on the streets of Macau on 21 November 2004. Unlike other races, such as the Masters of Formula 3, the 2004 Macau Grand Prix was not a part of any Formula Three championship, but was open to entries from all Formula Three championships. For the first time in the history of the Macau Grand Prix, the race itself was made up of two races: a ten-lap qualifying race that decided the starting grid for the fifteen-lap main race. The 2004 race was the 51st running of the Macau Grand Prix and the 22nd for Formula Three cars.

The Grand Prix was won by ASM Formule 3 driver Alexandre Prémat, having finished third in previous day's qualification race which was won by Lewis Hamilton of Manor Motorsport. Prémat took the lead of the Grand Prix when Nico Rosberg and Hamilton went too fast into a corner and slid into a tyre barrier at Lisboa corner and held it for the rest of the race to win after it ended early for a four-car pile up at Police Bend that made the circuit impassable on the thirteenth lap. Second place went to the other Manor Motorsport car driven by Robert Kubica while third was Lucas di Grassi of Hitech Racing.

Background and entry list
The Macau Grand Prix is a Formula Three race considered to be a stepping stone to higher motor racing categories such as Formula One and has been termed the territory's most prestigious international sporting event. The 2004 Macau Grand Prix was the fifty-first running of the event and the twenty-second time the race was held to Formula Three regulations. It took place on the  twenty-two turn Guia Circuit on 21 November 2004 with three preceding days of practice and qualifying.

In order to compete in Macau, drivers had to compete in a Fédération Internationale de l'Automobile (FIA)-regulated championship meeting during the calendar year, in either the Formula Three Euro Series or one of the domestic championships, with the highest-placed drivers given priority in receiving an invitation to the race. Within the 32 car grid of the event, each of the three major Formula Three series were represented by their respective champion. Jamie Green, the Formula Three Euro Series champion, was joined in Macau by the British champion Nelson Piquet Jr., Japanese series victor Ronnie Quintarelli, Italian champion Matteo Cressoni and Asian series winner Christian Jones. The sole driver to represent the German series in Macau was Ho-Pin Tung. Five competitors who did not take part in any Formula Three championship throughout the year received invitations from race organisers to participate in the Macau Grand Prix. They were Formula BMW Asia series winner Marchy Lee, and Macau natives Jo Merszei, Michael Ho, Lei Kit Meng and Rodolfo Ávila.

After the race was held over two legs since its establishment in 1983, the Macau Grand Prix Committee changed the format for 2004 onward to a ten-lap qualification race on Saturday afternoon which determined the starting order for the Grand Prix itself the day after. Furthermore, any driver who retired from the qualification race could start at the back of the grid for the main event and allow themselves a chance of winning. This was in contrast to previous years when any driver who failed to finish every lap of the first leg could not clinch the overall win. Co-Coordinator of the Macau Grand Prix Committee João Manuel Costa Antunes said the changes were made to simplify the Grand Prix for motor racing fans, enhance tension over the weekend, and to provide a larger incentive for drivers to push hard without worrying about losing their chance of victory.

Practice and qualifying
There were two 30-minute practice sessions preceding the race on Sunday: one on Thursday morning and one on Friday morning. In the first practice session, ThreeBond Racing's Fábio Carbone set the fastest lap at 2 minutes and 15.216 seconds. Carbone was six-tenths of a second faster than Richard Antinucci in second. Lewis Hamilton (participating as a free agent after his contract with McLaren had expired), Robert Kubica, Nico Rosberg, Kazuki Nakajima, Quintarelli, Danny Watts, Alexandre Prémat and Naoki Yokomizo were third to tenth. Hamilton's front wheel nut loosened, which prevented him from viewing in his mirrors because of visibility problems. He entered the pit lane to have the problem corrected. Kubica then grazed a barrier at Lisboa corner after swerving to avoid ramming into Álvaro Parente. He later ran wide on cement that was laid to clear oil left from a support series and understeered into the Melco hairpin wall.

Qualifying was divided into two 45-minute sessions; the first was held on Thursday afternoon, and the second on Friday afternoon. The fastest time set by each driver from either session counted towards his final starting position for the qualification race. The start of the opening qualifying session was delayed by fifteen minutes due to multiple accidents during practice for the GT Tires Asian Formula Renault Challenge and the CTM Touring Car Cup races. When it did begin in warm and sunny weather, Hamilton led early on and never ceded first as he continued to improve his lap time and finished at 2 minutes and 12.344 seconds. He avoided wrecking his car in a wall after going wide onto some dust. Green was consistently quick and his best lap came at his final attempt. It put him second but more than a second adrift of Hamilton. 2003 pole sitter Carbone was third and Antinucci moved up the order in the closing minutes to place fourth. Watts was as high as second early on but fell to fifth by the end due to him electing to save a set of tyres for Friday. Rosberg finished sixth, ahead of Franck Perera and Nakajima. Both Quintarelli and Parente were in the top five early on but finished ninth and tenth. The fastest driver not to set a top ten lap was Adam Carroll and he was followed by his British compatriot James Rossiter. Prémat and Nokomizo were provisionally on the grid's seventh row and were joined in the order by Loïc Duval and Piquet. Rob Austin and Katsuyuki Hiranaka were next up ahead of Tung, Kubica, Ho, Cressoni, Daisuke Ikeda, Lee, Jones, Lucas di Grassi, Marko Asmer, Éric Salignon, Lei, Avila, Merszei and Giedo van der Garde. Van Der Garde crashed on his out-lap at San Francisco Bend corner and removed two of his car's wheels. The first red flag came a third of the way through as Salignon had an accident at Maternity Bend turn and needed extricating. After a short interval, Kubica, Lee, di Grassi, Ikeda and Asmer stopped at the Melco hairpin and track marshals moved their cars. A second red flag came with ten minutes left as Parente heavily damaged his car in an impact with the Teddy Yip Bend corner wall.

In the second half-hour practice session, Kubica was consistently fast and paced the field with a lap of 2 minutes and 12.303 seconds. Hamilton made some changes to his car but was 0,646 seconds behind his teammate in second and Carbone was third. In fourth place was Antinucci, Prémat was fifth and Green sixth. Perera, Rosberg, Rossiter and Quintarelli completed the top ten ahead of second qualifying. Although the session passed without a stoppage being necessitated, three minor incidents were observed as Jones lost control of his vehicle at Moorish Hill corner and Van der Garde and Carroll were caught off guard at the same turn but all three did not sustain any significant damage to their cars. Nakajima crashed into a wall just before the entrance to the Melco hairpin.

The start of the second qualifying session was disrupted when a car appeared to be grounded at the Melco hairpin, which prompted everybody else to scramble for space on the narrow part of the track. Lei put his car into a wall at Faraway turn 12 minutes in and was about to recover when Avila collected him. This caused the session's first red flag since the circuit became impassable. As drivers began improving their times, Salignon triggered the second red flags as he crashed into the Maternity Bend corner wall while attempting to avoid Kubica. The final red flag was waved as Nakajima ran wide at the R-Bend turn, spun into a wall, ricocheted into the track's centre, and littered debris. Hamilton did not improve due to the interruptions to the session and him causing a multi-car accident at the Melco hairpin. His teammate Kubica became the first Polish driver to claim pole position in Macau in the final five minutes with a 2 minutes and 12.155 seconds lap. Hamilton joined Kubica on the grid's front row and Anuticci moved up one place at the session's end to start from third. Rosberg claimed fourth and Piquet moved eleven places from the first qualifying session to take fifth. Although Green and Carbone improved their times, they fell to sixth and seventh. Prémat and di Grassi moved to eighth and tenth and separated Nakajima in ninth. Behind them the rest of the field composed of Watts, Duval, Perera, Parente, Quintarelli, Yokomizo, Rossiter, Carroll, Salignon, Hiranaka, Austin, Ikeda, Cressoni, Asmer, Lee, Van der Garde, Tung, Jones, Ho, Avila, Lei and Merszei.

Qualifying classification
Each of the driver's fastest lap times from the two qualifying sessions are denoted in bold.

Warm-up one
A ten-minute warm-up session was held on the morning of the qualifying race. Hamilton carried over his strong form to pace the session with a time of 2 minutes and 12.904 seconds having been more than two seconds faster than any one else in the session's early moments. His closest challenger was Carbone in second and Kubica was third. Rosberg was fourth fastest, ahead of Duval and Watts. Di Grassi, Antinucci, Piquet and Nakajima followed in the top ten.

Qualifying race

The qualifying race to set the starting order for the main race started in dry and sunny weather at 14:00 Macau Standard Time (UTC+08:00) on 20 November. Hamilton made a good getaway to cling onto the slipstream of his teammate Kubica who was on the inside line going into Reservoir turn. Hamilton steered left to frighten Kubica into slowing and claimed the lead on the approach to Mandarin Bend corner and he kept it entering Lisboa turn. Further back, a series of incidents on the grid called for the safety car's deployment for four laps. Antinucci was slow leaving his starting slot and Piquet went to the right to overtake him but the latter's manoeuvre ended up with him removing his car's left-front wheel. A larger accident was triggered when Nakajima stalled in his grid slot and the rear of his vehicle was run into by Salignon, who then speared into a barrier alongside the track just after the start/finish line. Tung glimpsed space to drive through but he was launched airborne after striking the rear of Lee's car, who aggressively turned to the right as Avila got collected.

With debris on the track, the remaining drivers were circumspect across the start/finish line and avoided sharp debris to avoid a punctured tyre. Under the safety car, Piquet returned to the pit lane without his front-left wheel fully attached and he retired because his team could not repair it before the race's conclusion. Salignon was trapped in his car and required external assistance from course officials. This was attributed to the long amount of time the safety car was on the circuit. Later, he was transported to a local hospital for precautionary observations and was released with no major injuries found. In the meantime, circuit marshals extricated the stricken cars from the track via crane and laid cement dust. Hamilton held the lead at the lap five restart and Rosberg moved past Kubica entering Mandarin Bend corner. Carroll hassled Perera for eleventh and overtook him before the conclusion of the fifth lap. Carroll then set himself about drawing closer to Rossiter. Elsewhere, Green passed Carbone to claim fourth. Carbone tried to retake the position but could not do so as Green defended. As he pushed hard, Prémat got close to a barrier at Maternity Bend and got past Kubica on the run to Lisboa turn on lap six.

Duval led a pack of cars further down the order as Rossiter overtook Watts (who carried front wing damage) and the latter contended with Perera. Both slipstreamed each other on the circuit's main straights. But when Antinucci became involved, it went awry as Carroll passed Watts going into Lisboa corner on lap seven. Antinucci was caught off guard by this and had to venture onto the turn's escape road. Antinucci tried to restart his car but was unsuccessful and marshals extricated it. Hamilton set the race's fastest lap on lap nine at 2 minutes and 12.801 seconds to pull out a lead of 2.2 seconds and win the race for pole position in the Grand Prix itself. Rosberg was second and Prémat completed the podium in third. Off the podium Kubica withstood pressure from Green in the event's closing stages to claim fourth. Behind them Carbone, Duval, di Grassi, Rossiter and Watts rounded out the top ten. Outside the top ten, Carroll, Perera, Hiranaka, Austin, Yokomizo, Quintarelli, Parente, Ikeda, Asmer, Cressoni, Van Der Garde, Jones, Ho, Lei and Merszei were the final classified finishers.

Qualifying race classification

Warm-up two
A second warm-up session held over 20 minutes took place on the morning of the main race. Kubica recovered from his fourth-place finish in the qualification race and was able to top the time sheets with a lap of 2 minutes and 11.485 seconds. Prémat was almost three-tenths of a second adrift in second and Hamilton was third. Fourth place went to Green, Rosberg placed fifth and Antinucci sixth. The rest of the top ten were Rossiter, Piquet, Watts and Yokomizo. After warm-up, but before the Grand Prix, there was one less driver on the grid as the chassis of Salignon's vehicle sustained enough damage from his qualification race crash to warrant its withdrawal.

Main Race

The race began on 21 November at 15:45 local time under dry and sunny weather. On the grid, Hamilton was slow off the line and Rosberg moved into the lead going into Mandarin Bend corner. Behind the two Prémat held off a challenge from Kubica for third. Rossiter and his teammate Duval made contact on the approach to Lisboa turn. Both went onto the corner's run-off area and their races ended on the first lap. At the start of the second lap, Rosberg was pushing hard in his attempt to give himself some space over Hamilton and spent too much time observing the latter in his rear-view mirrors, causing him to drive into Lisboa turn too quickly with his brakes locked and slid sideways on oil laid by the support races. Rosberg ran into a tyre barrier with his car's front. Hamilton was also pushing hard when he ran wide. That rendered him unable to avoid piling into the rear of Rosberg's car. They were joined by Watts who was alongside Carroll on the straight and braked late. He saw Hamilton's stricken car and ventured onto the escape road. Hiranaka then spun into Watts but the latter avoided any noticeable damage as he returned to the track but the former lost a lot of time restarting his vehicle. Rosberg retired but Hamilton disentangled from his car and rejoined down the order.

Hamilton and Rosberg's crashes promoted Prémat into the lead with Kubica second. That lap Prémat got sideways at Moorish Hill corner and grazed a wall heavily with his left-rear tyre. He avoided retirement as there was no significant damage to his car. It did allow Kubica to close up but he could not affect an overtaking manoeuvre on Prémat. Further back, Carbone bent the right-hand side of his front wing when he ran into the rear of di Grassi's car and damaged the latter's diffuser. Nevertheless, the collision did not appear to slow di Grassi. The safety car was dispatched on lap three when Parente crashed heavily at the Solitude Esses complex. Track marshals extricated his car and debris was cleared. Under the safety car, Prémat checked his car's steering and found no problems with it. The race restarted at the start on the sixth lap and Prémat led. Kubica misjudged its timing and Green used this to slipstream past Kubica for second going into Lisboa corner. Kubica's tyres reached their optimum operating temperatures and he began to challenge Green for second as di Grassi blocked his Brazilian compatriot Carbone from a pass for fourth.

Carroll challenged Perera but was unsuccessful. Carbone then slowed as Carroll was near him and it enabled di Grassi to pull away slightly. Perera reclaimed sixth from Carroll on lap eight and Austin pressured the former. That lap, Green's chance of victory was over when he picked up a left-rear puncture from possible debris. He lost time running wide at Fisherman's Bend corner. Kubica overtook Green for second and he slowed on his way to the pit lane for new tyres. It appeared that the finishing order had been settled by this point but Ikeda disrupted the rhythm with an accident into a barrier and had to be extricated via crane. Avila and Jones collided at the Solitude Esses complex soon after and the safety car was deployed at the end of the ninth lap since the track was temporarily blocked. Yokomizo went off the track under the safety car; it did not extend its on-track time as it was withdrawn at the end of lap eleven. Prémat maintained the lead at the restart. As Prémat pulled away from Kubica, Carbone took the opportunity to overtake di Grassi for third at Lisboa corner and the latter immediately planned a counter-attack.

Carroll tried again at getting ahead of Perera but this did not succeed as he lost control of his car but kept off a barrier. In the meantime, Hamilton attempted to pass Nakajima when he went into a wall going uphill to Maternity Bend corner. Elsewhere, di Grassi sought to overtake Carbone only for the latter to block him. On lap 13, Asmer spun across the track at Police Bend; it became impassable when the trio of Hiranka, Jones and Tung piled into the corner. Officials elected to wave the red flags on the lap and the result of the race was counted back to the running order at the conclusion of lap eleven. This gave Prémat the victory and he became the third driver after David Coulthard (1991) and Takuma Sato (2001) to win the Macau Grand Prix and the Masters of Formula 3 in the same year. Kubica was 0.675 seconds behind in second. Carbone's overtake on di Grassi was nullified because of the red flags and the latter took third. Off the podium, Carbone was fourth, Perera fifth and the British duo of Carroll and Austin sixth and seventh. Quintarelli placed eighth, Antinucci gained seventeen positions to finish ninth and Piquet rounded out the top ten. Asmer, Watts, Nakajima, Hamilton, Van Der Garde, Tung, Jones, Lee, Lei, Green, Merszei, Yokomizo and Hiranka were the last of the classified finishers.

Main Race classification

References

External links
 

Macau
Macau Grand Prix
Macau Grand Prix
Macau Grand Prix Formula Three